Dušan Savić (born 1 October 1985) is a Macedonian international footballer who plays as a striker for GFK Dubočica.

Playing career

Club
Born in Niš, SR Serbia, back then part of Yugoslavia, Savić initially played for Serbian giants Red Star Belgrade youth teams. He made his debut as senior playing in Serbian lower-league side FK Dubočica. From there, Savić moved in summer 2004 to neighbouring Macedonia where he signed with FK Belasica paying in the Macedonian First Football League.

In March 2014, Savić signed for Kazakhstan Premier League side FC Kaisar.

On 18 February 2015, Savić signed for FC Zhetysu, extending his contract for a second year on 29 January 2016.

On 5 July 2016, Savić moved to fellow Kazakhstan Premier League side FC Tobol on an eighteen-month contract.

International
He was part of the U-21 team, before making his senior debut for Macedonia in an August 2007 friendly match against Nigeria. He has earned a total of 9 caps, scoring no goals and his final international was a June 2013 friendly against Norway.

Honours
Pobeda
Macedonian First League: 2006–07
Rabotnički
Macedonian Football Cup: 2008–09
Pakhtakor
Uzbek Cup: 2011

References

External links
 Dusan Savic, Official site
 
 Profile at MacedonianFootball.com 
 
 

1985 births
Living people
Sportspeople from Niš
Macedonian people of Serbian descent
Association football forwards
Macedonian footballers
North Macedonia under-21 international footballers
North Macedonia international footballers
FK Dubočica players
FK Belasica players
FK Pobeda players
FK Vardar players
FK Rabotnički players
FC Brașov (1936) players
Incheon United FC players
Pakhtakor Tashkent FK players
FC Volyn Lutsk players
FC Hoverla Uzhhorod players
FC Kaisar players
PFC Slavia Sofia players
FC Zhetysu players
FC Tobol players
FC Aktobe players
FK Zemun players
Macedonian First Football League players
Liga I players
K League 1 players
Uzbekistan Super League players
Ukrainian Premier League players
Kazakhstan Premier League players
First Professional Football League (Bulgaria) players
Serbian First League players
Macedonian expatriate footballers
Expatriate footballers in Romania
Expatriate footballers in South Korea
Expatriate footballers in Uzbekistan
Expatriate footballers in Ukraine
Expatriate footballers in Bulgaria
Expatriate footballers in Kazakhstan
Macedonian expatriate sportspeople in Romania
Macedonian expatriate sportspeople in South Korea
Macedonian expatriate sportspeople in Uzbekistan
Macedonian expatriate sportspeople in Ukraine
Macedonian expatriate sportspeople in Bulgaria
Macedonian expatriate sportspeople in Kazakhstan